The falling cat problem is a problem that consists of explaining the underlying physics behind the observation of the cat righting reflex.

Although amusing and trivial to pose, the solution of the problem is not as straightforward as its statement would suggest. The apparent contradiction with the law of conservation of angular momentum is resolved because the cat is not a rigid body, but instead is permitted to change its shape during the fall owing to the cat's flexible backbone and non-functional collar-bone. The behavior of the cat is thus typical of the mechanics of deformable bodies.

Several explanations have been proposed for this phenomenon since the late 19th century:

 Cats rely on conservation of angular momentum.
 The rotation angle of the front body is larger than that of the rear body.
 The dynamics of the falling cat have been explained using the Udwadia–Kalaba equation.

History
The falling cat problem has elicited interest from scientists including George Gabriel Stokes, James Clerk Maxwell, and Étienne-Jules Marey. In a letter to his wife, Katherine Mary Clerk Maxwell, Maxwell wrote, "There is a tradition in Trinity that when I was here I discovered a method of throwing a cat so as not to light on its feet, and that I used to throw cats out of windows. I had to explain that the proper object of research was to find how quick the cat would turn round, and that the proper method was to let the cat drop on a table or bed from about two inches, and that even then the cat lights on her feet."

Whereas the cat-falling problem was regarded as a mere curiosity by Maxwell, Stokes, and others, a more rigorous study of the problem was conducted by Étienne-Jules Marey who applied chronophotography to capture the cat's descent on film using a chronophotographic gun. The gun, capable of capturing 12 frames per second, produced images from which Marey deduced that, as the cat had no rotational motion at the start of its descent, the cat was not "cheating" by using the cat handler's hand as a fulcrum. This in itself posed a problem as it implied that it was possible for a body in free fall to acquire angular momentum. Marey also showed that air resistance played no role in facilitating the righting of the cat's body.

His investigations were subsequently published in Comptes Rendus, and a summary of his findings were published in the journal Nature. The article's summary in Nature appeared thus:

Despite the publication of the images, many physicists at the time maintained that the cat was still "cheating" by using the handler's hand from its starting position to right itself, as the cat's motion would otherwise seem to imply a rigid body acquiring angular momentum.

Solution
The problem was initially solved in 1969 by modelling the cat as a pair of cylinders (the front and back halves of the cat) capable of changing their relative orientations and has been described in terms of a connection in the configuration space that encapsulates the relative motions of the two parts of the cat permitted by the physics.  Framed in this way, the dynamics of the falling cat problem is a prototypical example of a nonholonomic system, the study of which is among the central preoccupations of control theory.  A solution of the falling cat problem is a curve in the configuration space that is horizontal with respect to the connection (that is, it is admissible by the physics) with prescribed initial and final configurations.  Finding an optimal solution is an example of optimal motion planning.

In the language of physics, Montgomery's connection is a certain Yang–Mills field on the configuration space, and is a special case of a more general approach to the dynamics of deformable bodies as represented by gauge fields, following the work of Shapere and Wilczek.

See also
 Momentum wheel
 Parallel parking problem

References

Works cited

Further reading
 Lagrangian Reduction and the Falling Cat Theorem

Biophysics
Cat behavior
Classical mechanics
Control theory
Rotation